Gogi Murmanovich Koguashvili (born 26 April 1969 in Kutaisi) is a Soviet and Russian former wrestler of Georgian descent who competed in the 1992 Summer Olympics, in the 1996 Summer Olympics, in the 2000 Summer Olympics, and in the 2004 Summer Olympics. He is the head coach of the Russian Greco-Roman wrestling national team.

References

External links
 

1974 births
Male sport wrestlers from Georgia (country)
Living people
Olympic wrestlers of the Unified Team
Olympic wrestlers of Russia
Wrestlers at the 1992 Summer Olympics
Wrestlers at the 1996 Summer Olympics
Wrestlers at the 2000 Summer Olympics
Russian male sport wrestlers
Wrestlers at the 2004 Summer Olympics
Olympic bronze medalists for the Unified Team
Olympic medalists in wrestling
Sportspeople from Kutaisi
World Wrestling Championships medalists
Medalists at the 1992 Summer Olympics
Russian people of Georgian descent
Georgian emigrants to Russia